Serghei Cechir (born 15 October 1990) is a Moldovan weightlifter who competes in the 69 kg division. He placed sixth at the 2016 Olympics. He won the bronze medal overall at the 2014 European Weightlifting Championships.

Major results

References

External links

 

1990 births
Living people
Moldovan male weightlifters
Olympic weightlifters of Moldova
Weightlifters at the 2016 Summer Olympics
European Weightlifting Championships medalists
20th-century Moldovan people
21st-century Moldovan people